Elevate is a youth-driven foster care program that was started in the summer of 2005 in Des Moines, Iowa, as a support group for foster and adopted youth. It is a program of Children & Families of Iowa, a nonprofit organization serving at-risk children and families in Iowa.

Elevate's mission is to inspire others to new levels of understanding and compassion to the life connection needs of foster care and adoptive teens by sharing their personal stories of hope.

About 
While Elevate originated in Des Moines, there are now chapters throughout the state of Iowa. Locations of chapters can be found on the Elevate website.

Elevate's activities include numerous types of advocacy. This includes training and empowering youth to advocate for themselves and others, educating legislators and other decision makers, developing partnerships to help youth successfully age out of foster care and encouraging others to open their homes to foster teens.

Membership includes current and former foster youth, adoptees from the foster care system and the biological children of foster and adoptive parents. Foster care alumni, social workers, foster and adoptive parents and juvenile attorneys function as supports for the group, but the majority of the decisions are made by the members or their governing council, the ECC. The ECC is composed of members elected by their peers.

Elevate is best known for personal stories and passionate speakers, but also includes artwork, poetry and other writing. Any foster or adopted person or the child of foster or adoptive parents over the age of seven can become an artist for Elevate and any one in these categories over the age of 13 can become a poet, speaker or writer for Elevate.

Elevate has had members speak at a number of different events around the country including dozens of events within the state of Iowa, and events in Seattle, Washington; San Antonio, Texas; Washington, DC; St. Louis, Missouri; Pittsburgh, Pennsylvania; Minneapolis, Minnesota; Columbus, Ohio and Atlanta, Georgia.

Projects 
Elevate projects are designed to provide its members with a means of self-expression while bringing awareness to the needs of foster and adoptive youth.  Travis Lloyd is an Elevate member, and former Elevate chapter facilitator, who developed the elevate: Desire to Inspire music and poetry CD, as well as a video called Voices of Youth.  These two projects are used as educational tools in university classes, social work trainings, and foster youth conferences.  Elevate projects, poetry, and stories of foster youth are available on the Elevate web site.

See also 
 Aging out

External links 
 Children & Families of Iowa

Support groups
Foster care
Youth organizations based in Iowa